Steckley is a surname. Notable people with the surname include:

Dawn Steckley (died early 2000s), Canadian figure skater
John Steckley (born 1949), Canadian scholar specializing in Native American studies and the indigenous languages of the Americas

See also
Steckle
Stockley (surname)